Cable's goby (Eleotrica cableae) is a species of goby endemic to reefs around the Galápagos Islands.  This species grows to a length of  SL.  This species is the only known member of its genus. The specific name honours the United States Government biologist Louella E. Cable (1900-1986), who illustrated this goby for the describer Isaac Ginsburg, and drew his attention to its separated ventral fins.

References

Gobiidae
Galápagos Islands coastal fauna
Monotypic fish genera